Hosni Farag (14 May 1944 – February 1984) was an Egyptian boxer. He competed in the men's bantamweight event at the 1964 Summer Olympics. At the 1964 tournament, he lost to Chung Shin-cho of South Korea in the Round of 32.

References

1944 births
1984 deaths
Egyptian male boxers
Olympic boxers of Egypt
Boxers at the 1964 Summer Olympics
Place of birth missing
Bantamweight boxers
20th-century Egyptian people